John Sinker  (21 December 1874  – 24 April 1936) was an Anglican priest and author.

Life
John Sinker was born into an ecclesiastical family, the fifth son of the Reverend Robert Sinker Educated at Cambridge University, he was ordained in 1898. He was Curate of Raughtonhead with Gatesgill and then Domestic Chaplain to the Bishop of Carlisle. In 1905 he became Vicar of Burneside and in 1910 of St. George's, Preston.  From 1915 to 1922 he was Rural Dean of the Fylde. In 1922 he became Vicar of Blackburn and in 1931 its first Provost. He died in post. His son was the Rev John Blamire Sinker.

Works
Memoirs of the Rev. Canon Stock, 1905
Into the Church’s Service, 1913
The Prayer Book in the Pulpit,1915
The War: Its Deeds and Lessons, 1916
The Round of the Church’s Clock, 1917
Through the Grave and Gate of Death, 1919
Plain Talks to Lancashire People, 1925

Notes

1874 births
Alumni of the University of Cambridge
Provosts and Deans of Blackburn
1936 deaths